Hero Honda Sa Re Ga Ma Pa: Golden Voice Hunt (powered by indiatimes.com) was an edition of the Zee TV program Sa Re Ga Ma Pa, presented by Shaan. The show ran along a format similar to the one used during the days when Sonu Nigam was the program's host: 8 quarterfinals, 4 semifinals, and one grand final.

Quarterfinals

1st quarterfinal

The participants were Anu Arora of Delhi, Jaini Shah of Gujarat, Satrujit Dasgupta of Kolkata, and Rahul Saxena of Delhi. The judges were Bhupinder Singh and Mitali Singh. The winners were Anu and Rahul.

2nd quarterfinal

The participants were Priyanka Guha Roy of Kolkata, Kuhoo Gupta of Ahmedabad, Vincent Caesar Soreng of Kolkata, and Sreekumar from Haryana. Bhupinder Singh and Mitali Singh judged once more and the winners were Priyanka and Sreekumar.

3rd quarterfinal

The participants were Sanchali Chatterjee of Bengal, Vidhi Mehta of Ahmedabad, Abhijeet Aroon of Mumbai, and Eric Sushant Rolston of Kanpur. The judges were Bhupinder Singh and Mitali Singh, while the winners were Vidhi and Abhijeet.

4th quarterfinal

Moumita Deb of Kolkata, Sejal Mankad of Ahmedabad, Rochak Goswami of Bhopal, and Kaushik Shukla from Orissa were the contestants. Bhupinder and Mitali judged, and Moumita and Kaushik won.

5th quarterfinal

Amruta Modak of Thane, Supriya Pathak from Bhopal, Manoj Sharma from Mathura, and Jayant Shukla of Bhopal participated. Pritam and Sunidhi Chauhan judged, Amruta and Jayant were the winners.

6th quarterfinal

Rimi Chopra of Chandigarh, Sudipta Roy of Kanpur, Rohit Singh of Lucknow, and Bhushan Kapadne from Nasik were the participants. Rohit Singh and Rimi Chopra were the winners.

Zee TV original programming